Paul Eremenko (born 1979 in Lviv, Soviet Union) is a Ukrainian American innovator and technology executive. He was formerly the Chief Technology Officer and Senior Vice President of United Technologies Corporation. Earlier, he served as the CTO of Airbus, and former CEO of Airbus Silicon Valley innovation center. He is a former Google executive and head of Google's Project Ara, an effort to create an open, modular smartphone platform. Eremenko was named one of the Top-10 Tech Leaders of 2015 in FORTUNE Magazine. Eremenko has also come out as a strong proponent of artificial intelligence and autonomy research. Eremenko has cited his desire to build a starship as the motivation underpinning his career.

Early life 
Paul was born in the family of Ukrainian mathematician Alexandre Eremenko in Lviv. When he was 13, his parents emigrated to the United States together with him.

Education

Eremenko earned a bachelor's degree in Aeronautics and Astronautics from MIT, a Master's in Aeronautics from Caltech, and a J.D. (law) degree from Georgetown University Law Center. He trained as a pilot at Aretz Airport near Purdue University.

Career

Universal Hydrogen 
On 23 September 2020, Eremenko announced Universal Hydrogen, a new business venture in aviation conversion systems for hydrogen fuel cells.

United Technologies Corporation 
On 30 November 2017, Eremenko was named Senior Vice President and Chief Technology Officer, effective 1 January 2018.  Eremenko will provide strategic leadership for the company's research, engineering and development activities in the global aerospace and building systems industries. He will also oversee the United Technologies Research Center. On 18 September 2019, he decided to leave UTC to pursue new opportunities.

Airbus Group

On 29 May 2015, Eremenko was named the founding CEO of Airbus Group Silicon Valley technology and business innovation center. In this capacity, he was responsible for establishing Airbus's Silicon Valley presence. Eremenko became Airbus Group CTO in July 2016 and left Airbus on 31 December 2017 citing pressures on his work-family life balance.

Google

At Google, Eremenko created and headed Project Ara, which seeks to democratize the mobile phone hardware ecosystem and to make the mobile internet accessible to the next five billion people. The project is also developing a production 3D printer to enable aesthetic customization of the modules that form the device. The ATAP division at Google aims to replicate the innovation model of the DARPA (Defense Advanced Research Projects Agency) in the private sector.

Motorola

Before moving to Google, Eremenko was Vice President of Advanced Technology at Motorola where he started Project Ara prior to Google's sale of Motorola Mobility to Lenovo, while retaining the project.

DARPA

Eremenko served as the Deputy Director and Acting Director of the Tactical Technology Office at DARPA, the office responsible for the agency's drones, robotics, X-planes, and satellite programs. While at DARPA, Eremenko developed and managed several projects, including an effort to revolutionize design and manufacture of complex military systems (such as vehicles and aircraft) called Adaptive Vehicle Make, the System F6 fractionated spacecraft program, and the 100 Year Starship. Eremenko was also responsible for a crowd-sourced military vehicle effort called XC2V which was said to revolutionize auto manufacturing.

At DARPA, Eremenko developed two education-themed efforts: DARPA's MENTOR program focused on building a manufacturing workforce, and InSPIRE which made the SPHERES robotic platform on the International Space Station accessible to high school students.

Booz Allen Hamilton

Eremenko started his career as an associate in the defense business segment of Booz Allen Hamilton, consulting in particular for DARPA, which he later joined.

Controversies 
Since Eremenko was responsible for DARPA's drone and robotics programs, he was asked in the 2013 Nova documentary Rise of the Drones whether he was concerned about the dangers of artificial intelligence, he replied "if you were to ask ... whether the Rise of the Machines-type scenario is a real concern ... my response would be, 'We should be so lucky.' In fact, if we could get little slivers of that kind of adaptive and cognitive capability into systems, that would be a very significant breakthrough, from where we stand today."

The 100 Year Starship, which Eremenko headed at DARPA, was named by U.S. Senator Tom Coburn as one of the 100 most wasteful government spending projects. Coburn specifically cited a 100 Year Starship workshop that included one session, entitled "Did Jesus die for Klingons too?" that debated the implications for Christian philosophy should life be found on other planets.

Other work

Eremenko was one of the creators and early proponents of a systems engineering strategy for creating more flexible and adaptable products known as value-driven design.

Personal life 
Eremenko is the son of the Ukrainian-American mathematician Alexandre Eremenko and the great grandson of a Marshal of the Soviet Union Andrei Eremenko’s brother Semion. Paul Eremenko was one of the most senior aerospace industry executives who is openly gay.

References

Living people
Georgetown University Law Center alumni
American people of Ukrainian descent
1979 births
Airbus people
MIT School of Engineering alumni
California Institute of Technology alumni